In music, Op. 43 stands for Opus number 43. Compositions that are assigned this number include:

 Atterberg – Aladdin
 Beethoven – The Creatures of Prometheus
 Chopin – Tarantelle
 Elgar – Dream Children
 Milhaud – Little Symphony No. 1
 Nielsen – Wind Quintet
 Rachmaninoff – Rhapsody on a Theme of Paganini
 Rossini – La Danza
 Roussel – Bacchus and Ariadne
 Schumann – 3 Duets
 Scriabin – Symphony No. 3
 Shostakovich – Symphony No. 4
 Sibelius – Symphony No. 2
 Spohr – String Quartet No. 11
 Strauss – Explosions-Polka
 Tchaikovsky – Orchestral Suite No. 1
 Waterhouse – Gestural Variations